The Corner Brook Royals are a senior ice hockey team based in Corner Brook, Newfoundland and Labrador and a member of the West Coast Senior Hockey League (WCSHL).

History
The Corner Brook Royals have their roots in picked teams from the local senior league beginning in 1927. Hockey in Corner Brook was first organized in 1925 following the completion of the pulp and paper mill. The first team of Corner Brook's best players, picked from the local league, was in February 1927 for a series with a visiting team from Sydney, Nova Scotia. That same year, a picked Corner Brook team played the first inter-papertown home-and-home series with a Grand Falls team in what would be an annual competition for the Tuma Cup.

In 1935 the St. John's league sent an invitation to the western champions for a series at the Prince's Rink to determine the first Newfoundland hockey champions. After winning its intertown series with Grand Falls, it was agreed that Corner Brook would represent western Newfoundland. The Corner Brook team defeated the Guards in the final game and was presented the recently donated Herder Memorial Trophy as the first all-Newfoundland champions.

The Corner Brook All-Stars were renamed the Royals in 1955 after the opening of the new Humber Gardens. The Royals' first provincial playoff action was in the all-Newfoundland section 'B' semi-finals in February 1956 against the Grand Falls Bees for the Evening Telegram Trophy. In 1958 and 1959, the Royals entered teams in both the section A and section B provincial playoffs.

In 1985, the Royals were the first Newfoundland team to win the G. P. Bolton Memorial Cup as Eastern Canadian senior hockey champions and hosted the 1985 Allan Cup championship. The series went to seven games but the Royals lost the series to the Thunder Bay Twins.

The following season, the Royals repeated as all-Newfoundland and Eastern Canadian champions. In the 1986 Allan Cup final, the Royals defeated the Nelson Maple Leafs in four straight games to become the first team from Newfoundland and Labrador to win the Allan Cup, the symbol of Canadian senior hockey supremacy.

Until 2012, the team's home arena was the Pepsi Centre, formerly the Canada Games Centre when it was built for the 1999 Canada Games. In August 2012, the team was renamed the Western Royals, and moved to Deer Lake due to increased cost of using the Pepsi Centre, and low turnout at games. Due to the low attendance at games, live radio broadcasts on CFCB ceased, hoping to get more people at the game.

Before the start of the 2014–15 season, the club were renamed the Corner Brook Royals and their home ice was the Corner Brook Civic Centre, the former Pepsi Centre.

Seasons and records

Season by season results
This is a list of the last five seasons completed by the Royals. For the full season-by-season history, see List of Corner Brook Royals seasons.

Note: GP = Games played, W = Wins, L = Losses, T = Ties, OTL = Overtime Losses, Pts = Points, GF = Goals for, GA = Goals against

WCSHL = West Coast Senior Hockey League, NSHL = Newfoundland Senior Hockey League, CWSHL = Central West Senior Hockey League. WCSHL = West Coast Senior Hockey League

Notes: The Royals relocated to Deer Lake for the 2012–13 and 2013–2014 seasons and were known as the Western Royals.

Allan Cup results

Current roster
The current team roster is on the West Coast Senior Hockey League website

Leaders

Captains
Craig Kennedy (1985–86)
Darren Colbourne (2007–08)
Morgan Warren (2008–09)
Michael Hynes (2014–16)

Coaches
Jim Grant (1979–80)
Terry Gillam (playing-coach 1979–80)
Forbes Kennedy (1980–81)
Steve Robson (playing-coach 1983–84)
Bobby Clarke (1984–85)
Mike Anderson (1985–87)
Gus Greco (playing-coach 1987–89)
Terry Gillam (1989-1990)
Rob French (2007–08)
Angus Head (2008–09)
Darren Langdon (2014–16)

Trophies and awards

Team awards
Awarded the Allan Cup in 1986 as Canadian Senior hockey champions.
Two Eastern Canadian hockey championships (G.P. Bolton Memorial Cup): 1985, 1986.
Ten all-Newfoundland senior hockey championships (Herder Memorial Trophy): 1935, 1962, 1964, 1966, 1968, 1977, 1985, 1986, 1988, 2001
First place in the Newfoundland Senior Hockey League (Evening Telegram Trophy): 1964, 1966, 1973, 1977, 
First place in the Central West Senior Hockey League: 2015

Individual awards
S.E. Tuma Memorial Trophy (Top scorer in the regular season)
Frank Dorrington, 1970, 1973, 1974
Robbie Forbes, 1986
Craig Jenkins, 1988

T.A. (Gus) Soper Memorial Award (MVP in the regular season)
Bruce Campbell, 1981
Dave Matte, 1986
Dan Cormier, 1988

Albert "Peewee" Crane Memorial Trophy (Senior league rookie of the year)
Bram Pike, 1971
Dave Oxford, 1974
Rob Brown, 1984
Kev McCarthy, 1985
Ken Mercer, 1986
Brent Jenkins, 1989

Howie Clouter memorial Trophy (Most sportsmanlike player in the regular season)
Robbie Forbes, 1987
Craig Jenkins, 1988
Darren McWhirter, 1989

Top Goaltender Award (Top goaltender in the regular season)
Bert Brake, 1964, 1966
Ted McComb, 1977
Dave Matte, 1986

Honoured Members

Retired Numbers
Note:(the date of the jersey # retirement is noted)
#2 Joe Lundrigan
#2 Craig Kennedy (November 2017)
#5 Danny Cormier (2011)
#15 Jimmy Guy (2015)
#17 Frank (Danky) Dorrington
#20 Terry Gillam (January 11, 2019)
#24 Shawn Neary (January 5, 2018)
#25 Darren Colbourne (January 2015)
#30 Dave Matte (November 6, 2011)

NL Hockey Hall of Fame
The following people associated with the Royals have been inducted into the Newfoundland and Labrador Hockey Hall of Fame.
Note:(the year of induction into NLHHOF is noted)
Doug Grant (1994)
Joe Lundrigan (1995)
Claude Anstey (1996)
Frank (Danky) Dorrington (1996)
Ernest Hynes (2003)
Jim Guy (2004)
Mike Anderson (2007)
Ed Lawrence (2010)
Eddie O’Quinn (2011)
Bert Brake (2012)
Todd Stark (2013)
Clobie Collins (2014)
Darren Colbourne (2015)
James Critch (2008)

See also
List of ice hockey teams in Newfoundland and Labrador

References

Bibliography

External links 
 Official website for the Royals

Ice hockey in Newfoundland and Labrador
Ice hockey teams in Newfoundland and Labrador
1935 establishments in Newfoundland
Corner Brook
Ice hockey clubs established in 1935